Rigney may refer to:

 Rigney, Doubs, Bourgogne-Franche-Comté, France
 Flagey-Rigney, Bourgogne-Franche-Comté, France

People with the surname
 Alitya Rigney (1942–2017), Australian Aboriginal scholar
 Ann Rigney (born 1957), Irish/Dutch cultural scholar
 Anne Rigney, Irish visual artist and sculptor
 Bill Rigney (1918–2001), American baseball infielder and manager
 Brian Rigney (born 1963), Irish former rugby union player
 Colm Rigney (born 1978), Irish rugby union player and coach
 Dorothy Comiskey Rigney (1916–1971), American businesswoman
 Ed Rigney (1893–1975), Australian rugby league footballer
 Frank Rigney (1936–2010), Canadian football offensive tackle
 Harlan Rigney (1933–1994), American farmer and politician
 Harriet Rigney (born 1939), American editor
 Hubert Rigney (born 1971), Irish former sportsperson
 Hugh M. Rigney (1873–1950), U.S. Representative from Illinois
 Jackson A. Rigney (1913–1998), American professor
 James Oliver Rigney, Jr. (1948–2007), American author better known by his pen name Robert Jordan
 Johnny Rigney (1914–1984), American baseball starting pitcher
 Layne Rigney, head of American outdoor equipment company Osprey Packs
 Niall Rigney (born 1969), Irish former hurling manager and player
 Stephen A. Rigney (1870–1947), American farmer and politician
 Tara Rigney (born 1999), Australian representative rower
 Tom Rigney, American musician
 Topper Rigney (1897–1972), American professional baseball player
 Wal Rigney (1898–1965), Australian rugby union player